Philip Nathan Ifil (born 18 November 1986) is an English former professional footballer of Saint Lucia descent who played as a defender. His former clubs include Tottenham Hotspur, Millwall, Southampton, Colchester United and Dagenham & Redbridge.

Career
Born in Willesden, London, Ifil attended Gladstone Park Primary School and Willesden High as a schoolboy. His mother is Greek-Cypriot and his father is from the West Indies. He played for Springfield Football Club based in Kingsbury, London before signing for Tottenham Hotspur as a teenager.

A full-back, he made his debut for Tottenham Hotspur against Liverpool on the first day of the 2004–05 season, and went on to make three appearances in the Premier League. His first two games came in the 2004–05 season, including the aforementioned Liverpool game and playing the full 90 minutes of a 1–0 win against Newcastle United at St James' Park. He had to wait two and a half years until April 2007 for his third appearance in the 2006–07 season in the teams' 3–3 draw with Wigan Athletic.

He represented England U20 at the 2003 FIFA World Youth Championship. On 28 September 2007 he joined English Championship side Southampton on a three-month loan deal. On 10 January 2008 he was transferred from Tottenham Hotspur to Colchester United for an undisclosed six figure fee, with various add-ons.

At the start of December 2009 Ifil had yet to score his first career goal, however this was to change when he scored two goals in as many games against Brighton on 11 December 2009 and Southend United on Boxing Day 2009.

On 10 September 2010, Ifil joined Dagenham & Redbridge for a one-year contract and made his debut away against Bournemouth in League One a day later. In May 2011 Dagenham announced the release of Ifil at the end of his contract. In July 2011, Ifil was signed by Kettering Town manager Morell Maison after impressing in pre-season.

Ifil joined Wrexham on trial in the hope of winning a contract with the Welsh club in January 2013.

As of December 2020 he was playing for Sun Sports Athletic in the Watford Sunday League. He began the 2021–22 season with Oxhey Jets of the Spartans South Midlands Premier Division.

Family
He is the brother of fellow professional footballer, Jerel Ifil.

Career statistics

References

External links
 Philip Ifil player profile at cu-fc.com
 Philip Ifil player profile at tottenhamhotspur.com
 England FA profile
 

1986 births
Living people
Footballers from Willesden
English footballers
England youth international footballers
Association football defenders
Tottenham Hotspur F.C. players
Millwall F.C. players
Southampton F.C. players
Colchester United F.C. players
Dagenham & Redbridge F.C. players
Kettering Town F.C. players
Oxhey Jets F.C. players
Premier League players
English Football League players
National League (English football) players
English people of Saint Lucian descent